Xanthichthys ringens, the Sargassum triggerfish, is a species of triggerfish  from the Western Atlantic, ranging from North Carolina (USA) to Brazil.

Description
Also known as the Redtail triggerfish, Xanthichthys ringens is often found in the Western Atlantic, ranging from South Carolina, through Gulf of Mexico to Lesser Antilles and Brazil. It lives in Tropical marine reefs at depths of 25 to 80 meters (82 to 262.5 ft). It generally reaching a size of 25cm (9.8 in).

Xanthichthys ringens has three dorsal spines, 26-29 dorsal soft rays, and 23–27 anal soft rays. Its coloration includes three silvery-blue prominent diagonal grooves from below and behind mouth running nearly to gill opening, appearing as light brownish gray to a light blue with rows of dark spots on body. The caudal (tail) fin is pale with orange-red margins and a large orange-red crescent at the end of the tail.

Xanthichthys ringens inhabits seaward reef slopes, usually well below 30 m, where in some places they are among the most common fish, solitary or in small groups. Spawns in deep water  young live among floating Sargassum, hence the name of Sargassum triggerfish. The fish feeds on crabs, shrimp, sea urchins and zooplankton.

Like other members of triggerfish, the sargassum triggerfish occasionally makes its way into the aquarium trade.

Gallery

References

External links
 

Balistidae
Fish of the Atlantic Ocean
Fish described in 1758
Taxa named by Carl Linnaeus